Shipyard Sally is a 1939 British musical comedy film directed by Monty Banks and starring Gracie Fields, Sydney Howard and Norma Varden. The film is notable for the song "Wish Me Luck as You Wave Me Goodbye", which became a major hit.

Plot
Sally, a failed music hall performer, and her father take over a pub near the John Brown & Company shipyard at Clydebank. When the closure of the yard threatens to put many out of work she leads a campaign to persuade the government to reconsider the decision.

Production
Made shortly before the outbreak of the Second World War, it was Fields' last British film. It was shot at Islington Studios with sets designed by  Alex Vetchinsky.

Cast
 Gracie Fields as Sally Fitzgerald
 Sydney Howard as Major Fitzgerald
 Morton Selten as Lord Alfred Randall
 Norma Varden as Lady Patricia Randall
 Oliver Wakefield as Forsyth
 Tucker McGuire as Linda Marsh
 MacDonald Parke as Diggs
 Richard Cooper as Sir John Treacher
 Joan Cowick as Secretary
 Monty Banks as Marsh’s doctor (uncredited)

References

Bibliography
 Shafer, Stephen C. British Popular Films 1929–1939:The Cinema of Reassurance. Rutledge, 1997.
 Wood, Linda. British Films, 1927–1939. British Film Institute, 1986.

External links
 

1939 films
British musical comedy films
1930s English-language films
1939 musical comedy films
Films directed by Monty Banks
Films set in Glasgow
Films set in London
20th Century Fox films
Islington Studios films
British black-and-white films
1930s British films